In music, Op. 33 stands for Opus number 33. Compositions that are assigned this number include:

 Beethoven – Bagatelles, Op. 33
 Chopin – Mazurkas, Op. 33
 Dvořák – Piano Concerto
 Eberl – Symphony in E-flat
 Enescu – Chamber Symphony
 Frankel – Symphony No. 1
 French – The Love for Three Oranges
 Glazunov – Symphony No. 3
 Haydn – String Quartets, Op. 33
 Jón Leifs – Requiem
 Kurtág – Stele
 Nielsen – Violin Concerto
 Rachmaninoff – Études-Tableaux, Op. 33
 Saint-Saëns – Cello Concerto No. 1
 Schoenberg – Zwei Klavierstücke
 Schumann – 6 Lieder (part songs for men's voices with piano ad lib)
 Tchaikovsky – Variations on a Rococo Theme
 Wheeldon – Rococo Variations